A Windsor chair (also known as a 'Welsh stick chair') is a chair built with a solid wooden seat into which the chair-back and legs are round-tenoned, or pushed into drilled holes, in contrast to standard chairs (whose back legs and back  uprights are continuous). The seats of Windsor chairs were often carved into a shallow dish or saddle shape for comfort. Traditionally, the legs and uprights were usually turned on a pole lathe. The back and sometimes the arm pieces (if arms are present) are formed from steam bent pieces of wood.

History 

It is not clear when the first Windsor Chairs were made. It is known that, as early as the 16th century,  wheelwrights started coping out chair spindles in the same way they made wheel spokes. The design was probably a development of West Country, Welsh and Irish 'stick-back' chairs, but the evidence on origin is not certain. It is thought that the first Windsor chair made its appearance in the county of Buckinghamshire, where the main centre of production eventually moved to High Wycombe. The first Windsors were of the comb-back variety. By the 18th century steam bending was being used to produce the characteristic "bow" of the Windsor chair.  The first chairs made this way were shipped to London from the market town of Windsor, Berkshire in 1724. There is speculation that the chair derives its name from the town of Windsor, which became the centre for the trade between the producers and the London dealers. Thus the name "Windsor Chair" is more about the style of chair than where it was made, with many diverse forms of Windsor chair being made worldwide.

Traditionally there were three types of craftsmen involved in the construction of a Windsor chair, there was the chair bodger, an itinerant craftsman who worked in the woods and made just the legs and stretchers, on a pole lathe. Then there  was the benchman who worked in a small town or village workshop and would produce the seats, backsplats and other sawn parts.
The final craftsman involved was the framer. The framer would take the components produced by the bodger and the benchman and would  assemble and finish the chair.

English settlers introduced the Windsor chair to North America, with the earliest known chairs being imported by Patrick Gordon who became lieutenant governor of Pennsylvania in 1726. There is speculation that the first American Windsor chair, based on the traditional British design, was made in Philadelphia in 1730.

Forms and construction 
There are about seven distinctive forms. These include:

 Sack-back

 Hoopback
 Comb-back

 Continuous arm
 Low back
 Rod back
 Fan back

It is common to find American Windsors made in the 18th century that contain three different species of wood. Pine, bass or tulip poplar are common for the seat. Non ring porous hardwoods such as Maple are stiff and make crisp turnings, and were used for the undercarriage. Ring porous species such as Oak, ash, and hickory all rive (split) and steam bend nicely. These woods are also straight grained and flexible and thus work well for slender parts such as the spindles.

The seat of a Windsor chair is an essential part since it provides the stability to both the upper and lower portions. The thickness of the seat allows the legs to be anchored securely into their respective tapered sockets, providing the undercarriage with strength and stability. A timber that will provide the strength and stability whilst also allowing it to be shaped, in order to achieve the desired look and feel, requires a strong durable timber, with interlocking grain, to provide the right characteristics.  English Windsors typically have elm seats because its interlocking grain gives good cross-grain strength that resists splitting where holes are placed close to the edge of a seat. There are no real satisfactory alternatives to elm although other woods have been tried, for example, oak and ash in Britain and various types of pine in the USA.  Because of elm's strength compared to pine, tulip poplar or bass, English Windsor chair seats are usually not as thick as American Windsors.   The English Windsor chair seats are not saddled (or dished) as deeply as their American counterparts- partly because of elm's relative strength, and partly because elm is comparatively more difficult to sculpt than the softer woods chosen by American chair makers. Woodwrights use tools such as the adze, scorp or inshave to form the hollowed out, form fitting, ergonomic top of the seat.

The legs are splayed at angles fore-and-aft (rake) as well as side-to-side (splay) to provide actual and visual support of the person sitting.  Early chairs made in America usually have stretchers connecting the front and back legs and a cross stretcher connecting the two side stretchers, creating what is known as an "H" stretcher assembly. A common misconception about this assembly is that the stretchers hold the legs together in order to keep them from pulling apart. In the traditional Windsor design, the wedged tenon joint which joins each leg to the seat is strong enough in itself to prevent the legs from creeping outward. The stretcher system actually pushes the legs apart to retain the necessary tension which reduces slack.

"Through-holed and wedged" is one of the primary means of joining Windsor chair parts. A cylindrical or slightly tapered hole is bored in the first piece, the matching cylindrical or tapered end of the second piece is inserted in the hole as a round tenon, and a wedge is driven into the end of this tenon, flaring it tight in the hole. The excess portion of the wedge is then cut flush with the surface. This supplies a mechanical hold that will prevail when the glue fails. In general, early Windsor chair joints are held together mechanically, making glue a redundant detail in their assembly.

Painted finishes 
Early British Windsors were painted, later versions were stained and polished. American Windsors were usually painted, in the 18th century they  were grain painted with  a light color, then overpainted with a dark color before being coated with linseed oil for protection of the fragile paint. In the 19th century settlers from the mid-west of America to Ontario, Canada would coat their chairs with the solid primary colours of milk paint, a mix of buttermilk, turpentine and cow's blood.

During the early 19th century the United States produced vast numbers of chairs, in factories, and an experienced factory painter could paint a chair in less than five minutes. By mid-century, to save production costs, the chair was painted in solid colours with some simple stencilling being the only design.

With wear in use, the paint wears off around the edges and displays a characteristic wear pattern that reveals the paint colors underneath. As for any antique, this original finish often survives best in unworn areas such as the bottom of the seat or around turnings. Later repainting, even well-intentioned restoration, will diminish the value of an original finish.

See also 
 High Wycombe Chair Making Museum
 List of chairs
 Windsor Institute
 Wycombe Museum

Notes

References

External links 

 Wycombe Museum
 Video on how to make a Windsor chair
 Harvard Chair

Chairs
Green woodworking
Chair-making
Furniture
Woodworking